Winnecke 4 (also known as Messier 40 or WNC 4) is an optical double star consisting of two unrelated stars in a northerly zone of the sky, Ursa Major.

The pair were discovered by Charles Messier in 1764 while he was searching for a nebula that had been reported in the area by Johannes Hevelius.  Not seeing any nebulae, Messier catalogued this apparent pair instead.  The pair were rediscovered by Friedrich August Theodor Winnecke in 1863, and included in the Winnecke Catalogue of Double Stars as number 4.  Burnham calls M40 "one of the few real mistakes in the Messier catalog," faulting Messier for including it when all he saw was a double star, not a nebula of any sort.

In 1991 the separation between the components was measured at 51.7″, an increase since 1764. Data gathered by astronomers Brian Skiff (2001) and Richard L. Nugent (2002) strongly suggested the subject was merely an optical double star rather than a physically connected (binary) system.

See also
 List of Messier objects

References

External links
 
 SEDS: Messier Object 40
 Messier 40 CCD LRGB image with 2 hrs total exposure
 

Double stars
Winnecke 4
Ursa Major (constellation)
4
Orion–Cygnus Arm
17641024
238107/8
G-type main-sequence stars
K-type giants